Pinyaram, panyaram, or penyaram (Jawi: ڤيڽرام) is traditional kue of Minangkabau in West Sumatra, Indonesia. This dish served during certain occasion, such as wedding parties, Ramadan and Eid al-Fitr. Today, pinyaram can be used as typical souvenir of Minangkabau.

Description
Pinyaram is made from mixture of white sugar or palm sugar, white rice flour or black rice, and coconut milk, the way to cooked is quite similar like cooking pancake.

Variations
Pinyaram is mainly divided into two variants, that are pinyaram putih (made from white rice) and pinyaram hitam (made from black rice). But today, pinyaram can be colorful.

See also
 Panyalam
 Kuzhi paniyaram

References

External links
 Tentang Pembuatan Pinyaram

Kue
Padang cuisine
Malay cuisine